Iridomyrmex conifer is a species of ant in the genus Iridomyrmex. Endemic to Australia, it was described by Forel in 1902.

References

External links

Iridomyrmex
Hymenoptera of Australia
Insects described in 1902